Tom Curren (born 29 July 1992) is a former professional Australian rules footballer who played for the St Kilda Football Club in the Australian Football League (AFL). He was recruited by the club in the 2011 Rookie Draft, with pick #24. Curren made his debut in Round 17, 2013, against  at Docklands Stadium.

Curren won the St Kilda Football Club Victorian Football League affiliate Sandringham Football Club best & fairest award in 2012.

Curren was delisted at the end of the 2016 season. Tom has now gone on to play for the Nepean Football League and has had some incredible games with 67 disposals being produced some rounds. 
He has not let himself go in the gym, and is still keeping his rig tidy. Often asked how he kept such a strong bench when being so light on the footy field. Bench pressing nearly 25kg in both arms.

References

External links

1992 births
Living people
St Kilda Football Club players
Australian rules footballers from Victoria (Australia)
Dandenong Stingrays players
Sandringham Football Club players